The Kategoria Superiore, officially known as Abissnet Superiore for sponsorship reasons, is a professional league for men's association football clubs. At the top of the Albanian football league system, it is the country's primary football competition. It is contested by 10 clubs, and operates on a system of promotion and relegation with the Kategoria e Parë. Seasons run from August to May, with teams playing 36 matches each (playing each team in the league four times, twice at home and twice away).

The competition was founded in 1930 as the Albanian National Championship during the reign of King Zog, shortly after the creation of the Albanian Football Association. Since 1930, 45 clubs have competed in recognised competitions, while only nine clubs have won the title: Tirana (26), Dinamo Tirana (18), Partizani (16), Vllaznia (9), Skënderbeu (8), Elbasani (2), Teuta (2), Flamurtari (1), and Kukësi (1). The current champions are Tirana, who won their 26th title in 2021–22.

History

Early history
Football was first introduced to Albania by an English-Maltese priest named Gut Ruter, who visited the Saverian college in Shkodër in 1908. The first football club in Albania was Indipendenca, founded in Shkodër in 1912 by Palokë Nika. The first 90-minute game to be played with two 45 minute halves took place in October 1913 between Indipendenca Shkodër and the occupying Austro-Hungarian Imperial Navy. The game is considered to be the first international game to be played in Albania, and it ended in a 2–1 loss for Indipendenca, with the captain and founder of the club Palokë Nika scoring the only goal for the Albanians.

World War II championships

Albania was invaded by Italy in April 1939 and World War II soon broke out, meaning the Albanian Football Association, much like the other organisations in the country, ceased operating. Despite the war, three championships were held between 1939 and 1942, with Tirana winning the championships in 1939 and 1942 and Shkodra winning in 1940. Despite calls to recognise these championships, the Albanian Football Association maintains the position that the championships were not organised by them and cannot be formally recognised.

Names

Records
Most points in a season 84 points. KF Tirana (2004–05)

Most points without winning the league title 79 points. KF Elbasani (2004–05)

First Albanian team to qualify for a European competition. KF Skenderbeu (2017–18) Europa League

First Albanian team to qualify for The Champions League. KF Vllaznia Women (2022–23)

Competition format
Since the 2014–15 Kategoria Superiore, the league consists of 10 clubs, who face each other four times in a conventional round-robin tournament for a total of 36 matches. At the end of the season, the two lowest-placed teams are relegated to the Kategoria e Parë, while two highest-placed teams of the Kategoria e Parë are promoted in their place. The 8th ranked team qualifies to the play-off round, which they play against the Kategoria e Parë play-off winner. Teams are ranked by total points, then head-to-head record, then goal difference, and then goals scored.

Clubs (2022–2023)

Current members
The following teams are competing in the Kategoria Superiore during the 2022–23 season.

List of champions

Since 1930, the competition has not been played a total of 9 times: 1935, 1938–44, 1949, 1962. Furthermore, the champion award was not given during the 1968–69 season.

Performance by club

 Tirana and Vllaznia would have accordingly 28 and 10 titles, if the three seasons played during WW2 are officially recognised from AFA.

All time table 
The all-time table of football clubs that have participated in the Kategoria Superiore, prior to the 2021–2022 season. The ranking is based on the total accumulated points by each club. Teams in bold are part of the 2022–23 season.

UEFA rankings

Current rankings (2022–23)
UEFA Country Ranking for league participation in 2022–23 European football season (Previous year rank in italics).
 37  (42)  League of Ireland Premier Division 
 38  (39)  Macedonian First Football League 
 39  (36)  Armenian Premier League 
 40  (37)  Latvian Higher League
 41  (38)  Kategoria Superiore
 42  (48)  NIFL Premiership 
 43  (44)  Erovnuli Liga
 44  (43)  Veikkausliiga
 45  (41)  Moldovan National Division

See also
 List of football clubs in Albania
 List of Kategoria Superiore all-time goalscorers

References
Notes

Citations

 
1
Albania